The sack of Thessalonica in 1185 by Normans of the Kingdom of Sicily was one of the worst disasters to befall the Byzantine Empire in the 12th century.

Siege 
David Komnenos, the governor of the city, had neglected to make sufficient preparations for the siege and even forbade sallies by the defenders to disrupt the Norman siege works. The Byzantine relief armies failed to coordinate their efforts, and only two forces, under Theodore Choumnos and John Maurozomes, actually came to the city's aid. In the event, the Normans undermined the city's eastern wall, opening a breach through which they entered the city. The conquest degenerated quickly into a full-scale massacre of the city's inhabitants, some 7,000 corpses being found afterwards. The siege is extensively chronicled by the city's archbishop, Eustathius of Thessalonica, who was present in the city during and after the siege.

Aftermath 
The Normans occupied Thessalonica until mid-November, when, following their defeat at the Battle of Demetritzes, they evacuated it. Coming on the heels of the usurper Andronikos Komnenos's massacre of the Latins in Constantinople in 1182, the massacre of the Thessalonians by the Normans deepened the rift between the Latins and the East. It also directly led to the deposition and execution of the unpopular Andronikos by the Latins and the rise to the throne of Isaac II Angelos.

Sources

1185 in Europe
1180s in the Byzantine Empire
Conflicts in 1185
Thessalonica 1185
Thessalonica 1185
Thessalonica 1185
Thessalonica 1185
Medieval Thessalonica
Massacres in the Byzantine Empire
Military history of Thessaloniki
12th century in the Kingdom of Sicily
Looting

λεηλάτησης της Θεσσαλονίκης